Lúcio Carlos Lima Rosa,  Lúcio (born 4 July 1975), is a Brazilian born, Belgian futsal player who plays for Châtelineau and the Belgian national futsal team.

References

External links
 
 
 Futsalplanet profile
 Futsalteam profile

1975 births
Living people
Belgian men's futsal players